The Civil Rights Act of 1964 silver dollar is a commemorative coin issued by the United States Mint in 2014. It was authorized by an act of congress, .

References

2014 establishments in the United States
Acts of the 110th United States Congress
Modern United States commemorative coins